Elvin James 'Eddie' Bowen (13 May 1916 – 10 December 1966) was an Australian rugby league player from the 1930s.

Eddie Bowen was a Canterbury junior league player who was graded in 1935 aged 19. He moved to St. George Dragons in 1936, before retiring.

Death
Eddie Bowen died on 10 December 1966 at Strathfield, New South Wales aged 50.

References

St. George Dragons players
Canterbury-Bankstown Bulldogs players
Australian rugby league players
1916 births
1966 deaths
Rugby league hookers
Rugby league players from Sydney